True Pulp Murder is a 30-minute documentary series that examines real murder cases from the point of view of the detectives who investigated them with commentary from actual murder mystery authors, while being told in a graphic novel style.

Episodes

Creators
 Lynn Booth - Producer
 Larisa Andrews – Co-Producer
 Larry Raskin – Creative Producer
 Brendan Woolard – Director
 Andrew West – Illustrator

External links 
 Official True Pulp Murder website
 True Pulp Murder on MySpace
 

2000s Canadian crime television series
2000s Canadian documentary television series
2007 Canadian television series debuts
Television shows filmed in Vancouver